Oliver Bohm (born April 14, 1992) is a Swedish professional ice hockey defenceman, currently playing for Västerås IK in the HockeyAllsvenskan (Allsv). He is the cousin of the former ice hockey player and current coach Andreas Johansson.

Playing career
Bohm played youth and junior ice hockey for Färjestads BK, in 2008 he represented Värmland in the TV-pucken. During the 2009–10 season Bohm was loaned from Färjestad to IFK Munkfors in Division 1, the third tier Swedish senior ice league. Bohm signed with Frölunda HC for the 2010–11 season to play in the J20 SuperElit, Sweden's premier junior ice hockey league. His first appearance with the club came in his hometown Karlstad during the Junior European Trophy, which Frölunda won after a 4–3 shootout win against Malmö in the final. Bohm scored his first goal in the Elitserien on January 10, 2013, against AIK's Niklas Lundström in a 1–3 win at Hovet.

On April 22, 2016, Bohm signed as an impending free agent to a three-year contract with his third SHL club, the Växjö Lakers.

Personal
Bohm is well documented for having an affinity for the yesteryear of rock music. Also, his unrelenting obsession with self improvement leads him to review previous contests on Dartfish TV nightly which perfectly exemplifies his professionalism. Perhaps, though, what he prides himself most of is his impeccably curated Dressman wardrobe that has taken nearly 3 painstaking years to assemble. Rumblings from the fashion underworld peg Oliver making his runway debut at the Dressman SS/17 show expected to take place in his hometown of Karlstadt.

Career statistics

Awards and honours

References

External links

1992 births
Almtuna IS players
Borås HC players
Frölunda HC players
BIK Karlskoga players
HV71 players
Living people
Malmö Redhawks players
IK Oskarshamn players
Sportspeople from Karlstad
Swedish ice hockey defencemen
Timrå IK players
HC TPS players
Växjö Lakers players